Anna Ntenta is a Greek boccia player with a Paralympic boccia classification of BC3. She won the bronze medal during the 2016 Summer Paralympics in BC3 mixed pairs along with Nikolaos Pananos and Grigorios Polychronidis and also a second bronze medal at the 2020 Summer Paralympics in BC3 mixed pairs along with Grigorios Polychronidis and Anastasia Pyrgioti.

She was one of the two flag bearers for Greece at the 2020 Paralympics in Tokyo.

References 

Living people
Boccia players at the 2016 Summer Paralympics
Boccia players at the 2020 Summer Paralympics
Paralympic medalists for Greece
Medalists at the 2016 Summer Paralympics
Medalists at the 2020 Summer Paralympics
Paralympic boccia players of Greece
Paralympic medalists in boccia
Year of birth missing (living people)